The Parnelli VPJ6 is an open-wheel race car, designed by British designer John Barnard for Vel's Parnelli Jones Racing, to compete in U.S.A.C. Championship Car, between 1975 and 1980, as well as in CART, between 1979 and 1980. It was driven by Danny Ongais, Al Unser, George Snider, Bill Whittington, Lee Kunzman, and A. J. Foyt. It notably gave Foyt his last IndyCar championship, in 1979. It was powered by the powerful and successful DFV-derived DFX.

References

American Championship racing cars
Open wheel racing cars